The historical drama or period drama is a film genre in which stories are based upon historical events and famous people. Some historical dramas are docudramas, which attempt an accurate portrayal of a historical event or biography, to the degree that the available historical research will allow. Other historical dramas are fictionalized tales that are based on an actual person and their deeds, such as Braveheart, which is loosely based on the 13th-century knight William Wallace's fight for Scotland's independence.

Due to the sheer volume of films included in this genre and in the interest of continuity, this list is primarily focused on films pertaining to the history of Near Eastern and Western civilization.

For films pertaining to the history of East Asia, Central Asia, and South Asia, please refer also to the List of historical films set in Asia.

Films set in the Stone Age (before 3300 BC)

Films set in the Bronze Age (3300–1200 BC)

Films set in the Iron Age  (1200 BC–500 BC)

Films set in the Classical Era (500 BC – 600 AD)

Films set in the medieval era (600–1500)

Early Middle Ages (7th–10th centuries)

Films set in the 11th century

Films set in the 12th century

Films set in the 13th century

Films set in the 14th century

Films set in the 15th century

Renaissance era (1500–1700)

Films set in the 16th century

Films set in the 17th century

Films set in the industrial era (1700–1900)

Films set in the 18th century

Films set in the 19th century

Films set in the modern era (1900–1949)

Films set in the atomic era (1950–1999)

Films set in the information era (after 2000)

{| class="wikitable sortable"
|-
! scope="col" | Title
! scope="col" | Release date
! scope="col" | Time period
! scope="col" class="unsortable" | Notes on setting
|-
|Holy Spider
|2022
|2000–2002
|Iranian serial killer Saeed Hanaei
|-
| Mary: The Making of a Princess || 2015 || 2000-2004|| the relationship between Mary Donaldson and Prince Frederik
|-
| Spotlight || 2015 || 2001 || The Boston Globe'''s investigative story on the Sexual abuse scandal in the Catholic archdiocese of Boston and the September 11 attacks
|-
|Diaz - Don't Clean Up This Blood|2012
|2001
|The 2001 G8 Summit in Genoa, Italy and the storming of the Armando Diaz school by police
|-
| William & Kate: The Movie || 2011 || 2001 || the relationship between Prince William and Catherine "Kate" Middleton (now The Duke and Duchess of Cambridge)
|-
| World Trade Center || 2006 || 2001 || September 11 attacks
|-
|United 93 || 2006 ||2001 || September 11 attacks
|-
| Flight 93 || 2006 || 2001 || September 11 attacks
|-
|Zero Dark Thirty || 2012 || 2001–2012 || The finding and assassination of Osama Bin Laden
|-
|Moneyball (film) || 2011 || 2002 || Based on Michael Lewis's 2003 nonfiction book of the same name, an account of the Oakland Athletics baseball team's 2002 season and their general manager Billy Beane's attempts to assemble a competitive team.
|-
|The Dropout|2022
|2002–2017
|Disgraced biotechnology company Theranos and its founder Elizabeth Holmes
|-
| The Social Network || 2010 || 2003–2007 || The founding of the social networking service-website Facebook
|-
| 127 Hours || 2010 || April 2003 || The true story about Aron Ralston, a mountain climber who had his arm trapped by a boulder while climbing in an isolated slot canyon in Utah.
|-
| The Impossible || 2012 || 2004 || The 2004 Indian Ocean tsunami, from the viewpoint of a tourist family in Thailand
|-
| The Hurt Locker || 2008 || 2004 || the Iraq War, just before the 2004 Indian Ocean tsunami
|-
| Lone Survivor || 2013 || 2005 || Based on the 2007 non-fiction book of the same name about Operation Red Wings by Marcus Luttrell and Patrick Robinson
|-
| The Big Short || 2015 || 2005–2008 || Based on the 2010 book of the same name, about numerous financial experts who predict and proceed to take advantage of the 2008 financial meltdown
|-
| The Fifth Estate || 2013 || 2007–2010 || About Julian Assange and the foundation of his news-leaking site WikiLeaks
|-
| Too Big to Fail || 2011 || 2008 || The 2008 financial meltdown
|-
| Million Dollar Arm || 2014 || 2008 || the story of Indian baseball pitchers Rinku Singh and Dinesh Patel
|-
| Sully || 2016 || 2009 || the story of Captain Chesley "Sully" Sullenberger and the aftermath of US Airways Flight 1549
|-
| Captain Phillips || 2013 ||  2009 || Kidnapping of merchant mariner Richard Phillips by Somalian pirates
|-
| Deepwater Horizon || 2016 || 2010 || Deepwater Horizon explosion
|-
| 13 Hours: The Secret Soldiers of Benghazi || 2016 || 2012 || 2012 Benghazi attack: During an attack on a U.S. compound in Benghazi, Libya, a security team struggles to make sense out of the chaos.
|-
|Uncut Gems|2019
|2012
|Kevin Garnett's performance in the 2012 NBA Eastern Conference Semi-finals
|-
| Patriots Day || 2016 || 2013 || The Boston Marathon Bombing.
|-
| Daniel || 2019 || 2013–2014 || the experiences of Daniel Rye who was held hostage by ISIS for 13 months
|-
| Operation Red Sea || 2018 || 2015 || The People's Liberation Army Navy entered the Yemeni Civil War and the International military intervention against ISIL.
|-
|Zola|2021
|2015
|Based on a vial Twitter thread about a part-time stripper who is convinced to travel to Tampa by her new friend for a gig.
|-
|Brexit: The Uncivil War|2019
|2015–2016
|The lead up to the 2016 Brexit referendum from the perspective of strategists in the Vote Leave campaign 
|}

 See also 

 Lists of historical films
 List of war films and TV specials
 List of World War II films
 List of films set in ancient Rome
 List of films set in ancient Greece
 List of films set in ancient Egypt
 List of films based on Greco-Roman mythology
 List of films featuring dinosaurs
 List of films based on actual events
 Lists of Western films
 Middle Ages in film
 List of films based on Arthurian legend
 Asian period drama films
Jidaigeki
 Samurai cinema
 Historical drama
 Historical fantasy
 Historical fiction
 Alternate history

References

 Sources 
 

 External links 
 History on Film—A historian looks at how Hollywood has presented historical events in the films.
 Fraser, George McDonald, The Hollywood History of the World, from One Million Years B.C. to 'Apocalypse Now''', London: M. Joseph, 1988; "First U.S. ed.", New York: Beech Tree Books, cop. 1988. Both eds. collate thus: xix, 268 p., amply ill. (b&w photos).  (U.K. ed.), 0-688-07520-7 (U.S. ed.)
 The Period-Drama Timeline—listing costume dramas according to the year in which they are set.
 Enchanted Serenity of Period Films—A fansite dedicated to period films.
 Period Movies and Dramas—listings of period films and costume dramas according to various criteria (century, subject, alphabetical, directors, and actors).
 Recycled Movie Costumes—Site dedicated to documenting costumes used in more than one film
 Frock Flicks—Blog and podcast about costumes in historical costume movies and TV shows.
 Period Movies Box—Blog with information on latest period movies, exciting facts and honest reviews.

Near Eastern and Western civilization